Stuart Burrell Lantz (born July 13, 1946) is an American former professional basketball player who is a television commentator for the Los Angeles Lakers of the National Basketball Association (NBA) on Spectrum SportsNet. He played college basketball at the University of Nebraska–Lincoln.

Early years
Lantz attended Uniontown Area High School. He accepted a basketball scholarship from the University of Nebraska–Lincoln. In the 1966–67 season, he contributed to the school having its first 20-win season (20-5), it first NIT Tournament bid and earning a second-place finish in the Big Eight Conference.

Lantz became the school's first two-time All-Big Eight selection. He led the Cornhuskers in scoring and rebounding in both the 1966–67 and 1967–68 seasons. He finished his college career with a 16.9 points, 48.5 percent shooting and 7.6 rebound average.

In 1989, Lantz' number 22 jersey was the second retired by the school. In 2001, he was inducted into the Nebraska Basketball Hall of Fame.

Professional career
Lantz played in the National Basketball Association from 1968 until 1976. He was selected by the San Diego Rockets in the third round (1st pick, 23rd overall) of the 1968 NBA draft and by the Oakland Oaks in the 1968 ABA Draft.

In the 1970-71 season, Lantz averaged 20.6 points and 5 rebounds per game for the San Diego Rockets.

In the 1976–77 season, he injured his back during a training camp scrimmage and never fully recovered during the year. On July 2, 1977, Lantz announced his retirement at 30 years old (a week and a half before his 31st birthday) because of the injury.

Broadcast career
Lantz has been the Lakers' color commentator since 1987, sharing the microphone with Chick Hearn, Paul Sunderland, Joel Meyers and now Bill Macdonald on Spectrum SportsNet. Lantz has been named by the Southern California Sports Broadcasters Association as the best television color commentator on seven occasions.  In 2018, he was inducted into the Southern California Sports Broadcasters Hall of Fame. On February 27, 2022, before a home game against the New Orleans Pelicans, the Lakers commemorated Lantz's 35 years broadcasting for the team with a pregame video tribute that featured celebratory messages from Pat Riley, Walt Frazier, Derek Fisher, and Shaquille O'Neal, among other basketball contemporaries.

References

External links
NBA player statistics @ basketballreference.com
 

1946 births
Living people
African-American basketball players
American men's basketball players
Basketball players from Pennsylvania
Detroit Pistons players
Houston Rockets players
Los Angeles Lakers announcers
Los Angeles Lakers players
National Basketball Association broadcasters
Nebraska Cornhuskers men's basketball players
New Orleans Jazz expansion draft picks
New Orleans Jazz players
Oakland Oaks draft picks
People from Uniontown, Pennsylvania
Point guards
San Diego Clippers announcers
San Diego Rockets draft picks
San Diego Rockets players
Shooting guards
21st-century African-American people
20th-century African-American sportspeople